The Korubo or Korubu, also known as the Dslala, are an indigenous people of Brazil living in the lower Vale do Javari in the western Amazon Basin. The group calls themselves 'Dslala', and in Portuguese they are referred to as caceteiros (clubbers). Much of what the outside world knows of this group is based on the research of Brazilian explorer Sydney Possuelo, who first contacted the tribe in October 1996, and journalist Paul Raffaele.

The Korubo are some of the last people on Earth to live in near-isolation from modern society, although they have, on numerous occasions, had violent contacts with the surrounding communities.

Culture
Their hunting and weapon of choice is the club and, aside from poison darts they use no other ranged weapons - their workday is about 4–5 hours long, and they often live inside large, communal huts known as malocas.

They have no known spiritual or religious practices, though they occasionally practice infanticide for unknown reasons. Both men and women paint themselves with a red dye from the roucou plant.

Their diet includes fish, spider monkeys, peccary, birds, wild pig, fruit, manioc and corn. A leading cause of illness and death within the tribe is by malaria. They have some knowledge of agriculture, making clearings for harvests of crops.

A dispute between about 20 members and the main tribe caused the two bands to separate. The main tribe is for the time being in complete isolation whereas the smaller band of Korubo have frequent interaction with neighbouring settlements and FUNAI employees. Population figures of the main tribe are unknown but estimated from aerial reconnaissance of houses to be a few hundred individuals.

National Geographic Magazine published an article about them in its August 2003 edition called After First Contact. More recently, in its April 2005 edition, The Smithsonian published an article about the same tribe called Out of Time.

The Korubo language is Panoan.

Involvement with FUNAI
The first peaceful contact in 1972 ended and over the following decades Brazil's FUNAI agency lost seven civil servants in attempts to establish a peaceful relation with them. This finally occurred in 1996.

Little is known about these people, because of FUNAI's refusal to let anthropologists study the group. After a long history from the 1950s of massacres of this indigenous people a special department of FUNAI organized an expedition in 1996 to establish a first peaceful contact with them. The Korubo in the past have killed trespassers on their land and the latest incident occurred in the year 2000, when Korubo warriors killed three lumbermen near the Native Reservation. FUNAI helps the Korubo by giving them modern immunization shots and checking up on them often. FUNAI also established a national park that encompasses the Korubo's land in order to stop logging in the area. Their goal is to prevent further contact with the tribe by modern society in order to preserve their way of life.

Skirmishes with the outside world
Soon after it broke away from the larger Korubo, the splinter group was chased away by the settlers of Lodario, killing two members.
Led by a warrior Ta'van, the Korubo killed three loggers.
Ta'van also killed close friend to Possuelo and FUNAI member Raimundo (Sobral) Batista Magalhães, on August 22, 1997. Sobral was attempting to take back a tarpaulin from the group.

See also
Sydney Possuelo
Other Uncontacted Groups of Brazil

Notes

External links
Out Of Time by Paul Raffaele, Smithsonian April 2005
The Last Tribal Battle by Diana Schemo New York Times October 1999
Death of Expert in Indigenous Issues Could Have Been Avoided Indianist Missionary Council Newsletter n. 275
Ethnologue Report for Korubo

Indigenous peoples of the Amazon
Indigenous peoples in Brazil
Uncontacted peoples